Hot comb alopecia was first reported in the late 1960s as a scarring alopecia seen in black women who straightened their hair with hot combs for cosmetic purposes, developing characteristically on the crown and spreading peripherally to form a large oval area of partial hair loss.

See also 
 Cicatricial alopecia
 List of cutaneous conditions

References 

 
Conditions of the skin appendages